Senegalia polyacantha, also known as white thorn, is a  flowering tree which can grow up to 25m tall. Polyacantha has the meaning "many thorns" in Latin.  The tree is native to Africa, India, the Indian Ocean and Asia, but it has also been introduced to the Caribbean.

Uses

Repellent uses
The root of Senegalia polyacantha subsp. campylacantha emits chemical compounds that repel animals including rats, snakes and crocodiles.

Gum
The tree's gum is used in the manufacture of candy.

Medicinal purposes
Senegalia polycantha's roots and perhaps its bark have medicinal uses. The root extract is useful for snakebites and is applied to wash the skin of children who are agitated at night time. The root is also used for treating gonorrhea, venereal diseases, dysentery and gastrointestinal disorders.

Tannin
The bark is useful for tanning.

Wood
The tree's primary use is for wood.

References

External links

polyacantha
Trees of Africa